Bala Velayat District is a district (bakhsh) in Bakharz County, Razavi Khorasan Province, Iran. At the 2006 census, its population was 17,145, in 3,723 families.  The District has no cities.  The District has one rural district (dehestan): Bala Velayat Rural District.

References 

Districts of Razavi Khorasan Province
Bakharz County